

A–B 

To find entries for A–B, use the table of contents above.

C 

 C.A.Arnold – Chester Arthur Arnold (1901–1977)
 Cabactulan – Derek Cabactulan (fl. 2016)
 Cabanès – Jean Gustave Cabanès (1864–1944)
 C.A.Barber – Charles Alfred Barber (1860–1933)
 C.Abbot – Charles Abbot (1761–1817)
 C.Abel – Clarke Abel (1789–1826)
 Cabezudo – Baltasar Cabezudo (born 1946)
 C.A.Br. – Clair Alan Brown (1903–1982)
 Cabrera – Ángel Lulio Cabrera (1908–1999) (not to be confused with botanist Ángel Cabrera (1879–1960))
 C.A.Clark – Carolyn A. Clark (fl. 1979)
 Cadet – Thérésian Cadet (1937–1987)
 Cady – Leonard Isaacs Cady (born 1933)
 Caflisch – Jakob Friedrich Caflisch (1817–1882)
 C.Agardh – Carl Adolph Agardh (1785–1859)
 C.A.Gardner – Charles Austin Gardner (1896–1970)
 Cajander – Aimo Cajander (1879–1943)
 Calder – James Alexander Calder (1915–1990)
 Calderón – Graciela Calderón (born 1931)
 Calest. – Vittorio Calestani (1882–1949)
 Caley – George Caley (1770–1829)
 Callm. – Martin Wilhelm Callmander (born 1975)
 Calonge – Francisco de Calonge (born 1938)
 Calzada – Juan Ismael Calzada (fl. 1997)
 Camarda – Ignazio Camarda (born 1946)
 Cambage – Richard Hind Cambage (1859–1928)
 Cambess. – Jacques Cambessèdes (1799–1863)
 Cameron – Alexander Kenneth Cameron (born 1908)
 C.A.Mey. – Carl Anton von Meyer (1795–1855)
 Caminhoá – Joaquim Monteiro Caminhoá (1835–1896)
 Camp – Wendell Holmes Camp (1904–1963)
 Campacci – Marcos Antonio Campacci (born 1948)
 Campb. – Douglas Houghton Campbell (1859–1953)
 Campd. – Francisco Campderá (also François Campderá) (1793–1862)
 Camper – Petrus Camper (1722–1789)
 Campb.-Young – Gael Jean Campbell-Young (born 1973) 
 Camus – Giulio (Jules) Camus (1847–1917)
 Canby – William Marriott Canby (1831–1904)
 Canne-Hill. – Judith Marie Canne-Hilliker (also Judith Marie Canne) (1943–2013) (also Canne)
 Cannon – John Francis Michael Cannon (1930–2008)
 Cantley – Nathaniel Cantley (died 1888)
 Cantor – Theodore Cantor (1809–1854)
 C.A.Paris – Catherine A. Paris (born 1962)
 Capuron – René Paul Raymond Capuron (1921–1971)
 Carbonó – Eduino Carbonó de la Hoz (born 1950)
 Card. – Jules Cardot (1860–1934)
 Cárdenas – Martín Cárdenas (1899–1973)
 Cardona – María de los Angeles Cardona (1940–1991)
 Cardot – Jules Cardot (1860–1934)
 Carestia – Antonio Carestia (1825–1908)
 Carey – William Carey (1761–1834)
 Cariot – Antoine Cariot (1820–1883)
 Carleton – Mark Alfred Carleton (1866–1925)
 Carlquist – Sherwin Carlquist (born 1930)
 Carlson – Margery Claire Carlson (1892–1985)
 Carnevali – Germán Carnevali (born 1955)
 Carolin – Roger Charles Carolin (born 1929)
 Caro – José Aristide Caro (1919–1985)
 Carp – Daniel Waterman Crane (1847–1922) ("Carp" was Crane's pen name.)
 Carr – Cedric Errol Carr (1892–1936)
 Carrasco – Maruja Carrasco (1944–2018)
 Carrick – John Carrick (1914–1978)
 Carrière – Élie-Abel Carrière (1818–1896)
 Carrington – Benjamin Carrington (1827–1893)
 Carruth. – William Carruthers (1830–1922)
 Carson – Joseph Carson (1808–1876)
 Caruel – Théodore Caruel (1830–1898)
 Carus – Carl Gustav Carus (1789–1869)
 Carver – George Washington Carver (1864–1943)
 Casar. – Giovanni Casaretto (1812–1879)
 C.A.Schenck – Carl Alwin Schenck (1868–1955)
 C.A.Sm. – Christo Albertyn Smith (1898–1956)
 Casp. – Johann Xaver Robert Caspary (1818–1887)
 Casper – Siegfried Jost Casper (born 1929)
 Cass. – Alexandre Henri Gabriel de Cassini (1781–1832)
 Cassone – Felice Cassone (1815–1854)
 Castagne – Jean Louis Martin Castagne (1785–1858)
 Castañeda – Marcelino Castañeda y Nuñez de Caceres (fl. 1954)
 Cast.-Campos – Gonzalo Castillo-Campos (born 1953)
 Castelnau – François Louis Nompar de Caumat de Laporte Castelnau (1810–1880)
 Castetter – Edward Franklin Castetter (1896–1978)
 Catling – Paul Miles Catling (born 1947)
 Cav. – Antonio José Cavanilles (1745–1804)
 Cavaco – Alberto Judice Leote Cavaco (born 1916)
 Cavanagh – Lucy Mary Cavanagh (1871–1936)
 Cavara – Fridiano Cavara (1857–1929)
 Cavestro – William Cavestro (fl. 1999)
 C.A.Weber – Carl Albert Weber (1856–1931)
 Cayzer – A. Cayzer (fl. 1922)
 C.Bab. – Churchill Babington (1821–1889)
 C.Bandara – Champika Bandara (fl. 2020)
 C.Barbosa – César Barbosa (born 1954)
 C.Bauhin – Gaspard Bauhin (1560–1624)
 C.Bayer – Clemens Bayer (born 1961)
 C.B.Beck – Charles B. Beck (fl. 1958–1967)
 C.B.Clarke – Charles Baron Clarke (1832–1906)
 C.Beards. – Cam Beardsell (fl. 1992)
 C.B.Rob. – Charles Budd Robinson (1871–1913)
 C.C.Berg – Cornelis Christiaan Berg (1934–2012)
 C.C.Chinnappa – Chendanda Chengappa Chinnappa (born 1939)
 C.C.Curtis – Carlton Clarence Curtis (1864–1945)
 C.C.Gmel. – Carl Christian Gmelin (1762–1837)
 C.C.Hall – Carlotta Case Hall (1880–1949)
 C.Chr. – Carl Frederick Albert Christensen (1872–1942)
 C.C.Hu – Chia Chi Hu (born 1932)
 C.C.Huang – Cheng Chiu Huang (born 1922)
 C.Clark – James Curtis Clark (born 1951)
 C.Clarke – Charles M. Clarke (fl. 1999)
 C.C.Robin – Claude Cesar Robin (born 1750)
 C.C.Tseng – Charles Chiao Tseng (born 1932)
 C.D.Adams – Charles Dennis Adams (1920–2005)
 C.DC. – Anne Casimir Pyrame de Candolle (1836–1918)
 C.D.Darl. – Cyril Dean Darlington (1903–1981)
 C.De Jong – Cornelis De Jong (fl. 1985)
 C.Deori – Chaya Deori (born 1974)
 C.D.Liu – Chu Dian Liu (fl. 2007)
 C.D.Specht – Chelsea D. Specht (fl. 2006)
 C.D.White – Charles David White (1862–1935)
 C.E.A.Winslow – Charles-Edward Amory Winslow (1877–1957)
 Ceballos – Luis Ceballos y Fernández de Córdoba (1896–1967)
 C.E.Bertrand – Charles Eugène Bertrand (1851–1917)
 C.E.Calderón – Cleofé Elsa Calderón (1929–2007)
 C.E.C.Fisch. – Cecil Ernest Claude Fischer (1874–1950)
 C.E.Cramer – Carl Eduard Cramer (1831–1901)
 C.E.Cumm. – Carlos Emmons Cummings (1878–1964)
 C.E.Hubb. – Charles Edward Hubbard (1900–1980)
 C.E.Jarvis – Charles Edward Jarvis (born 1954)
 Čelak. – Ladislav Josef Čelakovský (1834–1902)
 C.Elliott – Charlotte Elliott (1883–1974)
 Celsius – Olof Celsius (1670–1756) (uncle of astronomer Anders Celsius)
 C.E.O.Jensen – Christian Erasmus Otterstrøm (Otterström) Jensen (1859–1941)
 C.E.Parkinson – Charles Edward Parkinson (1890–1945)
 Cerv. – Vicente de Cervantes (1755–1829)
 Ces. – Vincenzo de Cesati (1806–1883)
 Cesalpino – Andrea Cesalpino (1519–1603)
 C.F.Baker – Charles Fuller Baker (1872–1927)
 C.F.Culb. – Chicita Frances (Forman) Culberson (born 1931)
 C.F.Fang – Cheng Fu Fang (born 1925)
 C.F.Gaertn. – Karl Friedrich von Gaertner (1772–1850)
 C.Fisch – Carl Fisch (born 1859)
 C.F.Ludw. – Christian Friedrich Ludwig (1757–1823)
 C.F.Reed – Clyde Franklin Reed (1918–1999)
 C.F.Schmidt – Carl Friedrich Schmidt (1811–1890)
 C.F.Wilkins – Carolyn F. Wilkins (fl. 1999)
 C.Gao – Chien Gao (born 1929)
 C.G.F.Hochst. – Christian Gottlob Ferdinand von Hochstetter (1829–1884)
 C.G.Matthew – Charles Geekie Matthew (1862–1936)
 C.G.Westerl. – Carl Gustaf Westerlund (1864–1914)
 Chabaud – J.Benjamin Chabaud (1833–1915)
 Chabert – Alfred Chabert (1836–1916)
 Chadim – Vaclav Anthony Chadim (born 1929)
 Chaix – Dominique Chaix (1730–1799)
 Chakr. – Paritosh Chakraborty (born 1949)
 Chakrab. – Tapas Chakrabarty (born 1954)
 Chakrav. – Hira Lal Chakravarty (1907–1998 or 2000)
 Challinor – Richard Westman Challinor (1871–1951)
 Cham. – Adelbert von Chamisso (1781–1838)
 Chamb. – Charles Joseph Chamberlain (1863–1943)
 Chambray – Georges de Chambray (1783–1849)
 Champ. – John George Champion (1815–1854)
 Chantar. – Pranom Chantaranothai (born 1955)
 Chaowasku – Tanawat Chaowasku (fl. 2006)
 Chapm. – Alvan Wentworth Chapman (1809–1899)
 Chappill – Jennifer Anne Chappill (1959–2006)
 C.Hartm. – Carl Hartman (1824–1884)
 Chase – Mary Agnes Chase (1869–1963)
 Chassot – Philippe Chassot (fl. 2003)
 Châtel. – Jean Jacques Châtelain (1736–1822)
 Chatterjee – Debabarta Chatterjee (1911–1960)
 Chatton – Édouard Chatton (1883–1947)
 Chaub. – Louis Athanase Chaubard (1785–1854)
 Chaumeton – François-Pierre Chaumeton (1775–1819)
 Chautems – Alain Chautems (fl. 1984) 
 C.H.Blom – Carl Hilding Blom (1888–1972)
 C.H.Curtis – Charles Henry Curtis (1869–1958)
 C.H.Eberm. – Carl Heinrich Ebermaier (1802–1870)
 Cheek – Martin Cheek (born 1960)
 Cheel – Edwin Cheel (1872–1951)
 Cheeseman – Thomas Frederic Cheeseman (1846–1923)
 Cheesman – Ernest Entwistle Cheesman (1898–1983)
 C.H.Ellis – Charles Howard Ellis (born 1929)
 Chenault – Léon Chenault (1853–1930)
 Cherd. – Valentina Yakovlevna Cherdantseva (born 1939)
 Cheremis. – Elena Andreevna Cheremisinova (born 1915)
 Cherler – Johann Heinrich Cherler (1570–1610) 
 Cherm. – Henri Chermezon (1885–1939)
 Cherm.Mir. – Vicente Chermont de Miranda (1849–1907)
 Cheshm. – Ilija Vasilev Cheshmedjiev (born 1930)
 Chess. – Pascale Chesselet (born 1959)
 Chevall. – François Fulgis Chevallier (1796–1840)
 Chew – Wee-Lek Chew (born 1932)
 C.H.Hasse – Clara H. Hasse (1880–1926)
 Chi.C.Lee – Ch'ien C. Lee (fl. 2002)
 Chilton – Charles Chilton (1860–1929)
 Ching – Ren-Chang Ching (1898–1986)
 Chinnock – Robert Chinnock (born 1943)
 Chin S.Chang – Chin Sung Chang (born 1959)
 Chiov. – Emilio Chiovenda (1871–1941)
 Chippend. – George McCartney Chippendale (1921–2010)
 Chippind. – Lucy Katherine Armitage Chippindall (1913–1992)
 Chiron – Guy Robert Chiron (born 1944)
 Chitaley – Shya Chitaley (1918–2013)
 Chitt. – Frederick James Chittenden (1873–1950)
 C.H.Lank. – Charles Herbert Lankester (1879–1969)
 Chmiel – Edward Chmiel (fl. 2013) (not to be confused with Chmiel., Jerry G. Chmielewski)
 Chmiel. – Jerry G. Chmielewski (fl. 1987) (not to be confused with Chmiel, Edward Chmiel)
 C.H.Mull. – Cornelius Herman Muller (1909–1997)
 Chodat – Robert Hippolyte Chodat (1865–1934)
 Choisy – Jacques Denys Choisy (1799–1859)
 Cholnoky – Béla Jenö Cholnoky (1899–1972)
 Chopinet – Robert G. Chopinet (1914–1975)
 Chouard – Pierre Chouard (1903–1983)
 Christ – Konrad Hermann Heinrich Christ (1833–1933)
 Christenh. – Maarten Joost Maria Christenhusz (born 1976)
 Christenson – Eric Alston Christenson (1956–2011)
 Christian – Harold Basil Christian (1871–1950)
 Christoph. – Erling Christophersen (1898–1994)
 Chrtek – Jindřich Chrtek (born 1930)
 C.H.Stirt. – Charles Howard Stirton (born 1946)
 Chud. – René Chudeau (1864–1921)
 Chun – Woon Young Chun (1890–1971)
 C.H.Wright – Charles Henry Wright (1864–1941)
 C.I.Blanche – Charles Isodore Blanche (1823–1887)
 Cif. – Raffaele Ciferri (1897–1964)
 Cirillo – Domenico Cirillo (1739–1799)
 C.J.Brand – Charles John Brand (1879–1949)
 C.J.Burrows – Colin James Burrows (born 1931)
 C.Jeffrey – Charles Jeffrey (born 1934)
 C.J.French – Christopher J. French (fl. 2012)
 C.J.Gould – Charles Jay Gould (1912–1997)
 C.J.Hook – Cathy J. Hook (fl. 2016)
 C.J.Saldanha – Cecil John Saldanha (1926–2002)
 C.J.Webb – Colin James Webb (born 1949)
 C.K.Allen – Caroline Kathryn Allen (1904–1975)
 C.K.Liao – Chun Kuei Liao (fl. 2013)
 C.K.Lim – Chong Keat Lim (fl. 1996) 
 C.Kramer – Carl Kramer (1843–1882)
 C.Krauss – Christian Ferdinand Friedrich von Krauss (1812–1890)
 C.K.Schneid. – Camillo Karl Schneider (1876–1951)
 C.K.Spreng. – Christian Konrad (Conrad) Sprengel (1750–1816)
 Claassen – Martha Isabella Claassen (born 1931)
 Clairv. – Joseph Philippe de Clairville (1742–1830)
 C.L.Anderson – Charles Lewis Anderson (1827–1910) 
 Clap. – Jean Louis René Antoine Édouard Claparède (1830–1871)
 Clapperton – Bain Hugh Clapperton (1788–1827)
 Clarion – Jacques Clarion (1776–1844)
 Clark – Jane Jessie Clark (1881–1914)
 Clarke – Benjamin Clarke (1813–1890)
 Clarkson – Edward Hale Clarkson (1866–1934)
 Claus – Karl Ernst Claus (1796–1894)
 Clausen – Peter Claussen (dates unclear, 1801–1872 or 1804–1855)
 Clausing – Gudrun Clausing (born 1969), see also her married name abbreviation G.Kadereit
 Claussen – Peter Claussen (1877–1959)
 Claypole – Edward Waller Claypole (1835–1901)
 C.L.Boynton – Charles Lawrence Boynton (1864–1943)
 C.L.Chan – Chew Lun Chan (fl. 1990)
 Cleghorn – Hugh Francis Clarke Cleghorn (1820–1895)
 Cleland – John Burton Cleland (1878–1971)
 Clem. – Frederick Edward Clements (1874–1945)
 Clemants – Steven Earl Clemants (1954–2008)
 Clémencet – Marien Clémencet (L. Clémencet in IPNI) (fl. 1932)
 Clémençon – Heinz Clémençon (born 1935)
 Clement – Ian Duncan Clement (born 1917)
 Clemente – Simón de Roxas (Rojas) Clemente y Rubio (1777–1827)
 Clementi – Giuseppe C. Clementi (1812–1873)
 Clemesha – Stephen Chapman Clemesha (born 1942)
 Clem.-Muñoz – M. Clemente-Muñoz (fl. 1986)
 Clevel. – Daniel Cleveland (1838–1929) 
 C.L.Fenton – Carroll Lane Fenton (1900–1969)
 C.L.Hitchc. – Charles Leo Hitchcock (1902–1986)
 Clifford – Harold Trevor Clifford (1927–2019)
 Clifton – George Clifton (1823–1913)
 Clinton – George William Clinton (1807–1885)
 C.L.Leakey – Colin Louis Avern Leakey (born 1933)
 C.L.Long – Chun Lin Long ( fl. 1998)
 Clos – Dominique Clos (1821–1908)
 Clover – Elzada Urseba Clover (1896–1980)
 C.L.Scott – Charles Leslie Scott (1913–2001)
 C.L.Tso – Ching Lieh Tso
 Clus. – Carolus Clusius (or Charles de l'Écluse) (1526–1609)
 Clute – Willard Nelson Clute (1869–1950)
 C.L.Woodw. – Catherine L. Woodward (fl. 2007)
 C.L.Yeh – Ching Long Yeh (fl. 2006)
 C.Marquand – Cecil Victor Boley Marquand (1897–1943)
 C.Martin – Charles-Édouard Martin (1847–1937)
 C.Massal. – Caro Benigno Massalongo (1852–1958)
 C.Merck – Carl Merck (1761–1799)
 C.M.Kuo – Chen Meng Kuo (born 1948)
 C.Mohr – Charles Theodore Mohr (1824–1901)
 C.Moore – Charles Moore (1820–1905)
 C.Morel – Charles Morel (born 1793)
 C.Morren – Charles François Antoine Morren (1807–1858)
 C.M.Taylor – Charlotte Morley Taylor (born 1955)
 C.M.Weiller – Carolyn M. Weiller (fl. 1995)
 C.Nelson – Cirilo Nelson (alternative name: Cyril Hardy Nelson Sutherland) (born 1938)
 C.N.Forbes – Charles Noyes Forbes (1883–1920)
 C.Norman – Cecil Norman (1872–1947)
 C.N.Page – Christopher Nigel Page (1942–2002)
 Co – Leonardo Legaspi Co (1953–2010)
 Coates – F. Coates (fl. 1997)
 Coaz – Johann Coaz (1822–1918)
 Cobb – Nathan Augustus Cobb (1859–1932)
 Cocc. – Girolamo Cocconi (1822–1904)
 Cochet – Pierre Charles Marie Cochet (1866–1936)
 Cockayne – Leonard C. Cockayne (1855–1934)
 Cockburn – Peter Francis Cockburn (born 1946)
 Cockerell – Theodore Dru Alison Cockerell (1866–1948)
 Cockerton – Geoff T.B. Cockerton (fl. 2011)
 Cocks – John Cocks (1787–1861)
 Cocquyt – Christine Cocquyt (born 1955)
 Codd – Leslie Edward Wostall Codd (1908–1999)
 Cogn. – Alfred Cogniaux (1841–1916)
 Cogollo – Alvaro Cogollo (fl. 1993)
 Cohn – Ferdinand Julius Cohn (1828–1898)
 Coincy – Auguste-Henri de Coincy (1837–1903)
 Coker – William Chambers Coker (1872–1953)
 Colas. – Maria Antonietta (Maretta) Colasante (born 1944)
 Colden – Jane Colden (1724–1766)
 Colebr. – Henry Thomas Colebrooke (1765–1837)
 Coleby – David Coleby (fl. 2015)
 Colenso – William Colenso (1811–1899)
 Colla – Luigi Aloysius Colla (1766–1848)
 Collad. – Louis Théodore Frederic Colladon (1792–1862)
 Collen. – Iris Sheila Collenette (1927–2017)
 Collett – Henry Collett (1836–1901)
 Collie – Alexander Collie (1793–1835)
 Collins – Frank Shipley Collins (1848–1920)
 Collinson – Peter Collinson (1694–1768)
 Colmeiro – Miguel Colmeiro (1816–1901) 
 Colomb – Marie Louis Georges Colomb (1856–1945)
 Columbus – James Travis Columbus (born 1962)
 Colvill – James Colvill (c.1777–1832)
 Comes – Orazio Comes (1848–1923)
 Comm. – Philibert Commerçon (1727–1773)
 Compton – Robert Harold Compton (1886–1979)
 Conant – Norman Francis Conant (1908–1984)
 Cond. – Charles Marie de La Condamine (1701–1774)
 Conforti – Visitación Conforti (born 1953)
 Congdon – Joseph Whipple Congdon (1834–1910)
 Conger – Paul Sidney Conger (1897–1979)
 Connor – Henry Eamonn Connor (1922–2016)
 Conrad – Solomon White Conrad (1779–1831)
 Conran – John Godfrey Conran (born 1960)
 Console – Michelangelo Console (1812–1897)
 Constance – Lincoln Constance (1909–2001)
 Constant. – Ovidiu Constantinescu (1933–2012)
 Conw. – Hugo Conwentz (1855–1922)
 Conz. – Cassiano Conzatti (1862–1951)
 Coode – Mark James Elgar Coode (born 1937)
 Cook – James Cook (1728–1779)
 Cooke – Mordecai Cubitt Cooke (1825–1914)
 Cookson – Isabel Clifton Cookson (1893–1973)
 Cooper – Daniel Cooper (1817?–1842)
 Cooperr. – Tom Smith Cooperrider (born 1927)
 Cootes – James Edward Cootes (born 1950)
 Cope –  (born 1949)
 Copel. – Edwin Bingham Copeland (1873–1964)
 Copley – Peter Bruce Copley (born 1956)
 Copp. – Amédée Coppey (1874–1913)
 Coppins – Brian John Coppins (born 1949)
 Corb. – François Marie Louis Corbière (1850–1941)
 Corda – August Carl Joseph Corda (1809–1849)
 Cordem. – Eugène Jacob de Cordemoy (1835–1911)
 Core – Earl Lemley Core (1902–1984)
 Corill. – Robert J. Corillion (1908–1997)
 Cornejo – Xavier Cornejo (fl. 2002)
 Corner – Edred John Henry Corner (1906–1996)
 Cornut – Jacques-Philippe Cornut (c. 1606–1651)
 Corrêa – José Francisco Corrêa da Serra (1751–1823)
 Correll – Donovan Stewart Correll (1908–1983)
 Correns – Carl Correns (1864–1933)
 Corrick – Margaret Georgina Corrick (1922–2020)
 Cortés – Santiago Cortés (1854–1924)
 Cortesi – Fabrizio Cortesi (1879–1949)
 Cory – Victor Louis Cory (1880–1964)
 Coss. – Ernest Saint-Charles Cosson (1819–1889)
 Costantin – Julien Noël Costantin (1857–1936)
 Costerm. – Leon F. Costermans (born 1933)
 Cothen. – Christian Andreas von Cothenius (1708–1789)
 Cotton – Arthur Disbrowe Cotton (1879–1962)
 Coult. – Thomas Coulter (1793–1843)
 Courchet – Lucien Désiré Joseph Courchet (1851–1924)
 Court – Arthur Bertram Court (1927–2012)
 Courtec. – Régis Courtecuisse (born 1956)
 Courtney – Shannel P. Courtney (fl. 2008)
 Courtois – Richard Joseph Courtois (1806–1835)
 Coustur. – Paul Cousturier (1849–1921)
 Cout. – António Xavier Pereira Coutinho (1851–1939)
 Coville – Frederick Vernon Coville (1867–1937)
 Cowan – John Macqueen Cowan (1891–1960)
 Cowie – Ian D. Cowie (fl. 1994)
 Cowles – Henry Chandler Cowles (1869–1930)
 Cowley – Elizabeth Jill Cowley (born 1940)
 Cox – Euan Hillhouse Methven Cox (1893–1977)
 C.Palmer – Charles Mervin Palmer (born 1900)
 C.P.Raju – C. Prabhakar Raju (born 1962)
 C.Presl – Carl Borivoj Presl (1794–1852)
 C.P.Robin – Charles Philippe Robin (1821–1885)
 C.P.Sm. – Charles Piper Smith (1877–1955)
 Crabbe – James Albert Crabbe (1914–2002)
 Crabtree – D. R. Crabtree (fl. 1983–1990)
 Cragin – Francis Whittemore Cragin (1858–1937)
 Craib – William Grant Craib (1882–1933)
 Craig – Thomas Craig (1839–1916)
 Cralley – Elza Monroe Cralley (1905–1999)
 C.Ramesh – Ch. Ramesh (fl. 1986)
 Crampton – Beecher Crampton (1918–2002)
 Crand. – Bowen Sinclair Crandall (born 1909)
 Crand.-Stotl. – Barbara Jean Crandall-Stotler (born 1942)
 Crane – Fern Ward Crane (born 1906)
 Cranfield – Raymond Jeffrey Cranfield (born 1947)
 Cranfill – Raimond Cranfill (fl. 1981)
 Crantz – Heinrich Johann Nepomuk von Crantz (1722–1799)
 Cranwell – Lucy May Cranwell (1907–2000)
 Cranz –  (1723–1777)
 Cratty – Robert Irwin Cratty (1853–1940)
 Craveiro – Sandra Carla Craveiro (born 1969)
 Craven – Lyndley Alan Craven (1945–2014)
 Crawshay – Richard Crawshay (1862–1958)
 Crayn – Darren M. Crayn (fl. 1998)
 C.R.Ball – Carleton Roy Ball (1873–1958)
 C.R.Bell – Clyde Ritchie Bell (1921–2013)
 C.Rchb. – Carl (Karl) Ludwig von Reichenbach (1788–1869)
 C.R.Carter – Charles R. Carter (fl. 1980s)
 C.Regel – Constantin Andreas von Regel (1890–1970)
 Crép. – François Crépin (1830–1903)
 Cretz. –  (1909–1946)
 Cribb – Alan Cribb (born 1925)
 Crins – William J. Crins (born 1955)
 C.Ríos – Carlos Ríos (fl. 2008)
 Crisci – Jorge Victor Crisci (born 1945)
 Crisp – Michael Douglas Crisp (born 1950)
 C.Rivière – Charles Marie Rivière (born 1845)
 C.R.Metcalfe – Charles Russell Metcalfe (1904–1991) 
 Croat – Thomas Bernard Croat (born 1938)
 Croizat – Léon Camille Marius Croizat (1894–1982)
 Cron – Glynis Cron (fl. 1994)
 Cronk – Quentin Cronk (fl. 1980)
 Cronquist – Arthur John Cronquist (1919–1992)
 C.Rosenb. – Caroline Friderike Rosenberg (1810–1902)
 Crossl. – Charles Crossland (1844–1916)
 Crowden – R.K. Crowden (fl. 1986)
 C.R.P.Andrews – Cecil Rollo Payton Andrews (1870–1951)
 C.R.Parks – Clifford R. Parks (fl. 1963)
 Crueg. – Hermann Crüger (1818–1864)
 Crundw. – Alan Crundwell (1923–2000)
 Crusio – Wim Crusio (born 1954)
 C.R.Yeh – Chuan Rong Yeh (fl. 2008)
 C.Schultze – Christian Friedrich Schultze (1730–1755)
 C.S.Ding – Ding Suqin (fl. 1976)
 C.Siebold – Karl (Carl) Theodor Ernst von Siebold (1804–1885)
 C.S.Kumar – C. Sathish Kumar (born 1957)
 C.S.Leou – Chong Sheng Leou
 C.S.Li – Cheng Sen Li (born 1948)
 C.Sm. – Christen Smith (1785–1816)
 C.S.P.Foster – Charles S.P. Foster (fl. 2013)
 C.S.P.Parish – Charles Samuel Pollock Parish (1822–1897)
 C.Sprague – Charles James Sprague (1823–1903)
 C.Stuart – Charles Stuart (1802-1877)
 C.T.Gaudin – Charles-Théophile Gaudin (1822–1866)
 C.T.Lee – Chi Te Lee (fl. 2013)
 C.Tracy – Clarissa Tracy (1818–1905)
 C.Tul. – Charles Tulasne (1816–1884)
 C.T.White – Cyril Tenison White (1890–1950)
 Cuatrec. – José Cuatrecasas (1903–1996)
 Cuénod – Auguste Jean Cuénod (1868–1954)
 Cuev.-Fig. – Xochitl Marisol Cuevas-Figueroa (fl. 2005)
 Cufod. – Georg Cufodontis (1896–1974)
 Culham – Alastair Culham (born 1965)
 Cullum – Thomas Gery Cullum (1741–1831)
 Culm. – Paul Frédéric Culmann (1860–1936)
 Cuming – Hugh Cuming (1791–1865)
 Cumm. – Clara Eaton Cummings (1855–1906)
 Cumming – William Archibald Cumming (born 1911)
 Cummins – George Baker Cummins (1904–2007)
 Curie – Peter Friedrich Curie (1777–1855)
 Curl – Herbert Charles Curl (born 1928)
 Curn. – William Curnow (1809–1887)
 Curr. – Frederick Currey (1819–1881)
 Currah – Randolph S. Currah (born 1954)
 Curran (also K.Brandegee) – Mary Katharine Curran (1844–1920)
 Currie – James Nimrod Currie (born 1883)
 Curtis – William Curtis (1746–1799)
 Curto – Michael Leonard Curto (born 1956)
 Curzi – Mario Curzi (1898–1944)
 Cutak – Ladislaus Cutak (1908–1973)
 Cuvier – Georges Cuvier (1769–1832)
 C.Velásquez – César Velásquez (fl. 2009)
 C.V.Hartm. – Carl Vilhelm Hartman (1862–1941)
 C.V.Morton – Conrad Vernon Morton (1905–1972)
 C.Walcott – Charles Doolittle Walcott (1850–1927)
 C.Walter – Charles Walter (1831–1907)
 C.W.Andrews – Charles William Andrews (1866–1924)
 C.Weber – Claude Weber (fl. 1968)
C.W.Emmons – Chester Wilson Emmons (1900–1985)
 C.Winkl. – Constantin (Konstantin) Georg Alexander Winkler (1848–1900)
 C.Winslow – Charles Frederick Winslow (1811–1877)
 C.W.Powell – Charles Wesley Powell (1854–1927)
 C.Wright – Charles Wright (1811–1885)
 C.W.Schneid. – Craig William Schneider (born 1948)
 C.W.Thomson – Charles Wyville Thomson (1830–1882)
 C.Y.Wang – Chang Yong Wang (born 1934)
 C.Y.Wu – Cheng Yih Wu (1916–2013)
 Czerep. – Sergei Kirillovich Czerepanov (1921–1995)
 Czern. – Vassilii Matveievitch Czernajew (1796–1871)
Czerniak. – Ekaterina Georgiewna Czerniakowska (1892–1942)
 C.Z.Nelson – Carl Z. Nelson (1870–1939)
 C.Z.Tang – Chen(Zhen) Zi Tang (fl. 1982)

D–Z 

To find entries for D–Z, use the table of contents above.

 
1

Botanists